Santa usually refers to the character Santa Claus, or Father Christmas.

Santa (feminine form of saint in various languages) may also refer to:

Arts, entertainment, and media
Santa (1932 film), the first Mexican narrative sound film
Santa (1943 film), a Mexican film
Santa (band), a Spanish rock band of the 1980s
Santa (TV series), a 1978 Mexican telenovela

Places

Extraterrestrial
1288 Santa, an asteroid
(obsolete) , a dwarf planet given the in-house nickname "Santa"

Inhabited places
Santa, Cameroon
Santa, Ghana
Santa, Montagnes, Ivory Coast
Santa, Woroba, Ivory Coast
Santa Province, Peru
Santa District
Santa, Peru
Santa, Ilocos Sur, Philippines
Santa, now Dumanlı, a district in modern northern Turkey

People
José Santa (born 1970), Colombian football player
Santa Claus (Alaskan politician), American politician 
Santa (given name), feminine given name

Other uses
La Santa, a secret criminal society in Italy
Santa, a stock character in Sardarji jokes
Santa F1, a grape tomato marketed by Santa Sweets, Inc.
Santa language, a Mongolic language spoken in northwest China
Šanta or Santa, a god worshiped in Bronze Age Anatolia

See also

Dear Santa (disambiguation)
My Santa (disambiguation)
Santa Claus (disambiguation)
Santa Claus machine, a fictional machine which can be used to convert materials into anything else
Santa claws (disambiguation)
Santa's Slay, a 2005 Canadian-American Christmas slasher comedy film that stars professional wrestler Bill Goldberg as Santa Claus
 Santa with Muscles, a 1996 American Christmas comedy film starring Hulk Hogan
Santalahti, a district in Tampere, Finland
Santo (disambiguation)
Santos (disambiguation)
Los Santos (disambiguation)